The Phoenix Coyotes 2006–07 season began as a rebuilding stage for the team, as they tried to become good enough to be a factor in the increasingly competitive Western Conference.  Not considered one of the "elite" teams in the West, the Phoenix Coyotes knew that they had to make some huge changes to reach that status.  They tried to do so by acquiring defenseman Ed Jovanovski and former all-stars Jeremy Roenick and Owen Nolan.  They hoped to get solid goaltending from Curtis Joseph, and with the former hockey great Wayne Gretzky as head coach, the Coyotes were looking to improve the game of their prospects with the leadership of their veteran players.

Regular season

The Coyotes struggled in shorthanded situations, allowing 92 power-play goals: the most in the League.

Season standings

Schedule and results

October

November

December

January

February

March

April

 Green background indicates win.
 Red background indicates regulation loss.
 White background indicates overtime/shootout loss.

Playoffs
For the fourth consecutive year, the Coyotes failed to make the playoffs.

Player statistics

Regular season
Scoring

Goaltending

•Mikael Tellqvist was acquired on November 28, 2006, from the Toronto Maple Leafs.  Stats reflect time with the Coyotes only.

Transactions

Free agents acquired

Free agents lost

Draft picks
Phoenix's picks at the 2006 NHL Entry Draft in Vancouver, British Columbia.

See also
 2006–07 NHL season

References

 Game log: Phoenix Coyotes game log on ESPN.com
 Team standings: NHL standings on ESPN.com
 Player stats: Phoenix Coyotes player stats on ESPN.com

Pho
Pho
Arizona Coyotes seasons